The Goya Award for Best Supporting Actress (Spanish: Premio Goya a la mejor interpretación femenina de reparto) is one of the Goya Awards, Spain's principal national film awards.

Since its inception, the award has been given to 31 actress. At the 1st Goya Awards ceremony held in 1987, Verónica Forqué was the first winner of this award for her role in Year of Enlightment. Verónica Forqué, Rosa Maria Sardà, María Barranco and Candela Peña have received the most awards in this category with two awards each. Chus Lampreave and Terele Pávez were nominated on six occasions with each winning one award.

As of the 2023 ceremony, Susi Sánchez is the most recent winner in this category for her role as Begoña in Lullaby.

Winners and nominees
In the following table, the years are listed as per Academy convention, and generally correspond to the year of film release; the ceremonies are always held the following year.

1980s

1990s

2000s

2010s

2020s

Multiple wins and nominations

The following individuals received two Best Supporting Actress awards:

The following individuals received three or more Best Supporting Actress nominations:

References

External links
Official site
IMDb: Goya Awards

Supporting actress
Film awards for supporting actress